Truist Field is a baseball stadium in Charlotte, North Carolina. The Uptown-area stadium hosts the Charlotte Knights, a Triple-A Minor League Baseball team in the International League. It is also the third sports building to be built in Uptown, after Bank of America Stadium (home of the NFL's Carolina Panthers and MLS's Charlotte FC) and Spectrum Center (home of the NBA's Charlotte Hornets).

History
An Uptown stadium for the Knights had been a long-running saga in Charlotte, occasionally the subject of contentious debate.  Since the dawn of the new millennium, the Knights had consistently had the worst attendance in the International League.  Their stadium at the time, Knights Stadium, was located in Fort Mill, South Carolina, 30 minutes south of Uptown Charlotte. Many fans were unwilling to brave the traffic on Interstate 77 to get there.

The project had been repeatedly blocked by Jerry Reese, a Charlotte lawyer who claimed the land swap was illegal.  Reese had ambitions to move a Major League Baseball team to Charlotte and viewed a Triple-A sized stadium for the Knights as a detriment.

In August 2006 the stadium became the source of more debate, as Mecklenburg County commission chairman Parks Helms said he would stall an arts project until the Charlotte City Council looked at a proposal he backed to bring baseball to Uptown.

Furthermore, it could expand the Atlantic Coast Conference's plans to return the Atlantic Coast Conference baseball tournament to Charlotte.  The ACC tournament had been held at Knights Stadium until the NCAA's ban on South Carolina having predetermined championships took effect because of NAACP pressure in relation to the state's display of the Confederate flag on the State House grounds.

The former site of the Piedmont and Northern Railway's Interurban Depot, which was razed before 1970 and had since been used for car parking and storage, was chosen as the location for the new ballpark in Uptown's Third Ward. Multiple new mid-rise hotels are expected to open in the area around the new stadium, along with restaurants and retail.

The first event held at the ballpark was a media softball game, which took place on March 22, 2014. The first Knights game took place on April 11, 2014.

The stadium hosted the 2016 Triple-A All-Star Game in which the International League All-Stars defeated the Pacific Coast League All-Stars, 4–2.

On January 31, 2018, Charlotte Knights Chief Operating Officer Dan Rajkowski announced that the Knights will host a total of six college baseball games during the upcoming season during the Sunbelt Rentals Collegiate Baseball Series. This is the most in the ballpark's history.

Truist Field hosted the 2021 Atlantic Coast Conference baseball tournament, May 25–30, 2021. The 2020 games were scheduled to be held at Truist Field but were cancelled due to the COVID-19 pandemic.

Naming rights

On April 23, 2012, it was announced that BB&T, a bank based in Winston-Salem, acquired the naming rights for the new ballpark. The terms of the deal were undisclosed and the ballpark was afterwards officially referred to as BB&T Ballpark.

In 2019, BB&T merged with Atlanta-based SunTrust to form Truist, based in Charlotte; on June 11, 2020, it was announced that new name would be Truist Field.

Features
The stadium features a two-level club with skyline views as well as a VIP, climate-controlled club with full-service bar.  In total, there are 975 club seats and 22 luxury suites at the ballpark.

As a hitter-friendly park, the ballpark had the highest home-run factor the International League and Triple-A from 2014 to 2016. Its hit factor was the highest in the league and the fifth-highest in Triple-A. Knights general manager Scotty Smith said that due to the limited lot size, the foul lines are a few feet shorter than minor-league guidelines.

Gallery

References

External links

Official website

Sports venues in Charlotte, North Carolina
Baseball venues in North Carolina
Charlotte Knights
2014 establishments in North Carolina
Sports venues completed in 2014
International League ballparks